Cyanonemertes is a genus of marine nemertean worms in the suborder Monostilifera. Cyanonemertes elegans, the sole species in the genus, is from Washington state, U.S.A.

References

External links 

 
 Cyanonemertes at the World Register of Marine Species (WoRMS)

Monostilifera
Nemertea genera
Monotypic protostome genera